Vazov Rock is a rocky peak of elevation of  in the south extremity of Peshev Ridge in Tangra Mountains, eastern Livingston Island in the South Shetland Islands, Antarctica.  This feature extends  in a southeast to northwest direction, and surmounts Vazov Point to the south, Boyana Glacier to the northeast and Brunow Bay to the southwest.

Location
It was mapped by the Bulgarian expedition Tangra 2004/05, who named it for the adjacent Vazov Point.

Maps
 L.L. Ivanov. Antarctica: Livingston Island and Greenwich, Robert, Snow and Smith Islands. Scale 1:120000 topographic map.  Troyan: Manfred Wörner Foundation, 2009.

References
 Vazov Rock. SCAR Composite Antarctic Gazetteer
 Bulgarian Antarctic Gazetteer. Antarctic Place-names Commission. (details in Bulgarian, basic data in English)

Rock formations of Livingston Island